Code page 1103 (CCSID 1103), also known as CP1103, or SF7DEC, is an IBM code page number assigned to the Finnish variant of DEC's National Replacement Character Set (NRCS). The 7-bit character set was introduced for DEC's computer terminal systems, starting with the VT200 series in 1983, but is also used by IBM for their DEC emulation. Similar but not identical to the series of ISO 646 character sets, the character set is a close derivation from ASCII with only nine code points differing.

Code page layout

See also
Code page 1106 (very similar Swedish code page differing only in one code point)
Code page 1018 (similar ISO-646-FI / ISO-646-SE / IR-10 code page)
National Replacement Character Set (NRCS)

References

1103
Finnish language